Marc Burckhardt is an American fine artist and illustrator. Burckhardt's work focuses on historical symbolism with contemporary themes. He uses a mix of both oil and acrylic paints in a modern variation of the Old Masters techniques of monochromatic underpainting and color glazing, often using wood panels. Burckhardt is additionally known for combining some paintings with pressed metal facades, historically known as rizas or oklads, forming elaborate patterns in the metal to create a jacket-like patterned covering

Early life and education
Burckhardt was born in Germany to German-born Jochem and American-born Chris Christenson Burckhardt. He grew up in Waco, Texas, where his parents worked as university professors at Baylor University. His mother was a painter and visiting art museums was common for the family. Burckhardt credits this combination of the American South and German culture with planting deep roots both in folk art and the darker vision of Flemish painters.

Burckhardt attended Baylor University, receiving undergraduate degrees in art history and printmaking. In 2009, Burckhardt was named one of Baylor's 150 Most Notable Alumni, for exceptional achievement in his field. Burckhardt went on to receive a BFA from Art Center College of Design in Pasadena, graduating with honors in 1989.

Early influences
Burckhardt's early influences were the painters Albrecht Dürer, Lucas Cranach, and Diego Rivera, but also comic artists such as Robert Crumb and Gilbert Shelton. Burckhardt was additionally influenced by the writings of art historian Leo Steinberg, and his landmark work The Sexuality of Christ in Renaissance Art and in Modern Oblivion.

Work
Burckhardt is quoted as saying that both his fine art work and his commissions are less influenced by any one artist and more with periods and genres such as Medieval religious icons, early American and English sporting paintings as well as Dutch secular genre painting, which he observes "served to aggrandize the subject rather than the artist".

Fine arts and gallery work
Burckhardt's work is in numerous private collections, including that of the estate of Johnny Cash, who commissioned Burckhardt to paint a portrait of his wife June Carter Cash for his home outside Nashville, Tennessee. Burckhardt's fine art works have been shown throughout the United States and internationally, at locations such as the Rock and Roll Hall of Fame, The Art Institute of Boston, Art Basel in Miami, Art Basel in Basel, Switzerland, SCOPE in New York, The Martin Museum of Art (Texas), Reial Cercle Artístic (Royal Artistic Circle) in Barcelona, Affenfaust Galerie (Hamburg), Mindy Solomon Gallery (Miami), Copro Gallery (Los Angeles), Bash Contemporary (San Francisco). In 2010, Burckhardt was named Texas State Artist by the Texas Legislature and the Texas Commission on the Arts.

Many of Burckhardt's gallery works are what he describes as "'possession-oriented portraiture' in which the animals, or ships, or people, aren't what they appear to be; they're placeholders for desires, fears, and ideals."

Illustration
Burckhardt's art has appeared on book covers, albums, storefronts, packaging & clothing, and been commissioned by clients that include Gucci, Rolling Stone, Atlantic Monthly, The New York Times, WIRED, and TIME, among others.

Burckhardt is recognized for his portraiture work, which has been commissioned by Major League Baseball, The Rock and Roll Hall of Fame, Sony Records, and others. His work has received numerous awards, including Gold & Silver medals from the New York Society of Illustrators, Cannes Lions, and the American Advertising Federation. He is a recipient of the prestigious Hamilton King Award from the American Museum of Illustration, and in 2019 Taschen named him one of the top 100 illustrators in the world.

Awards and service

Awards

 150 Most Notable Alumni, Baylor University (2009)
 Texas State Artist, Texas Commission on the Arts (2010) 
 Hamilton King Award, Society of Illustrators (2011)
 Presidential Award of Excellence in Scholarly/Creative Activities, Texas State University (2012)
 Two-time Hunting Art Prize finalist
 Silver Medal, Institutional Category, Top Dog, (2004) Society of Illustrators (46th Annual)
 Gold Medal, Institutional Category, Twins, (2009) Society of Illustrators (51st Annual)
 Silver Medal, Editorial Category, Whitewash, (2010) Society of Illustrators (52nd Annual)
 Gold Medal, Uncommissioned Category, Himmelblick, (2011) Society of Illustrators (53rd Annual)
 Gold Medal, Editorial Category, Over Fishing, (2012) Society of Illustrators (54th Annual)
 Silver Medal, Institutional Category, Gilded, (2013) Society of Illustrators (55th Annual)
 Gold & Silver Medals, "Horsepower", Cannes Lions (2014)
 Gold Medal, Advertising Category, Settler Sports Illustrated, (2017) Society of Illustrators (59th Annual)
 Silver Medal, Surface & Product Category, Gucci Homecoming, (2020) Society of Illustrators (62nd Annual)
 Gold Medal, Surface & Product Category, Gucci Storefront, (2021) Society of Illustrators (63rd Annual)
 Gold Medal, Uncommissioned, The Crossing, (2023) Society of Illustrators (65th Annual)

Service
 President of the Illustration Conference
 Chair of the Society of Illustrators 47th Annual

Personal life
Burckhardt divides his time between Austin, Texas and Germany. He is a past instructor at School of Visual Arts in New York City and Texas State University, in San Marcos, Texas, and is a frequent guest lecturer at universities and arts organizations.

See also 
 List of Baylor University people

References

External links
 

1962 births
20th-century American male artists
20th-century American painters
American contemporary painters
American illustrators
American male painters
American people of German descent
American portrait painters
Art Center College of Design alumni
Baylor University alumni
Living people
People from Waco, Texas